Spaceflight is the monthly magazine of the British Interplanetary Society (BIS), reporting on space exploration topics. It was first published in 1956.

In 2008, the magazine – edited by Clive Simpson – was the winner of the Sir Arthur Clarke Award in the category of Best Space Reporting.

External links
 BIS Publications
 British Interplanetary Society

1956 establishments in the United Kingdom
Monthly magazines published in the United Kingdom
Science and technology magazines published in the United Kingdom
Magazines established in 1956
magazine
Astronomy magazines